Polarity inversion may refer to:

 Polarity inversion (chemistry) (aka ), in organic chemistry
 Polarity inversion (differential pairs), swapping of positive and negative wires in differential signal links

See also 
 Polarity reversion
 Auto polarity (disambiguation)